The following is a partial list of linguistics journals.

General
Annual Review of Linguistics
Glossa
Journal of Linguistics
Language
Lingua
Linguistic Inquiry
Linguistic Typology
Natural Language and Linguistic Theory
Studies in Language
Theoretical Linguistics

Applied linguistics
Applied Linguistics
Bilingualism: Language and Cognition
Language Learning
Language Testing
Journal of Second Language Writing
System
TESOL Quarterly
The Modern Language Journal
Colombian Applied Linguistics Journal

Corpus linguistics
Corpus Linguistics and Linguistic Theory
International Journal of Corpus Linguistics

Philology
Archiv für das Studium der neueren Sprachen und Literaturen

Phonetics and phonology
Journal of the Acoustical Society of America
Journal of the International Phonetic Association
Journal of Phonetics
Phonetica
Phonology

Anthropological linguistics
Anthropological Linguistics

Area-specific

Africa
Journal of West African Languages
Arusha Working Papers in African Linguistics

East Asia
Cahiers de Linguistique Asie Orientale
Journal of Chinese Linguistics
Himalayan Linguistics

Southeast Asia
Journal of the Southeast Asian Linguistics Society
Linguistics of the Tibeto-Burman Area

European
Acta Linguistica Hungarica
Nordic Journal of Linguistics
Sámi Dieđalaš Áigečála

Native American languages
International Journal of American Linguistics
Journal de la société des américanistes

Oceania and Australia
Oceanic Linguistics

External links
List of linguistics journals at the LINGUIST List

Linguistics